Elhadji Bandeh Kandeh (born 8 February 1990) is a Spanish professional footballer who plays as a forward for UE Sant Andreu.

Club career
Born in Mataró, Barcelona, Catalonia, to Gambian parents, Bandeh represented Llongueras Sant Crist de Badalona, CF Damm, CE Europa as a youth. In 2009, he made his senior debut for CE Júpiter, in Primera Catalana. Five years later, he switched to Tercera División side FC Martinenc. He scored 16 goals in 32 matches and ended being the fifth highest scorer in his category in the season.

On 1 July 2015, Bandeh signed with AE Prat of the same tier. After a stint with Cerdanyola del Vallès FC in the following season, he moved to UE Sant Andreu on 17 July 2017, on a one-year deal.

On 31 January 2019, Bandeh moved abroad for the first time in his career and joined Greek Football League club Karaiskakis.

References

External links

1990 births
Living people
Spanish footballers
Association football forwards
Spanish people of Gambian descent
Spanish sportspeople of African descent
Tercera División players
CE Júpiter players
FC Martinenc players
AE Prat players
Cerdanyola del Vallès FC players
UE Sant Andreu footballers
Football League (Greece) players
A.E. Karaiskakis F.C. players
Spanish expatriate footballers
Expatriate footballers in Greece